Grant Ferguson (born 15 November 1993) is a Scottish cross-country mountain biker and cyclo-cross cyclist. He represented Scotland at the 2014 Commonwealth Games and finished 5th in the cross-country race He represented Great Britain at the 2016 Summer Olympics in the cross-country race.

Major results

Mountain bike

2010
 2nd National Junior XCO Championships
2011
 2nd  UEC European Junior XCO Championships
2012
 2nd National Under-23 XCO Championships
2013
 1st  National XCO Championships
 1st Redruth XC
 1st Hopton Woods XC
 1st Hadleigh Farm XC
2014
 1st  National XCO Championships
 1st Bundesliga XCO, Heubach
 1st Sherwood Pines XC
 1st Cannock Chase XC
 UCI Under-23 XCO World Cup
2nd Méribel
3rd Pietermaritzburg
3rd Windham
2015
 1st  National XCO Championships
 2nd  UEC European Under-23 XCO Championships
 3rd  UCI World Under-23 XCO Championships
2016
 1st  National XCO Championships
2017
 1st  National XCO Championships
2018
 1st  National XCO Championships

Cyclo-cross
2010–2011
 2nd National Junior Championships
2011–2012
 3rd National Under-23 Championships
2012–2013
 1st  National Under-23 Championships
2013–2014
 1st  National Under-23 Championships
2014–2015
 1st  National Under-23 Championships
 1st Derby, 
2017–2018
 1st  National Championships

References

1993 births
Living people
Scottish male cyclists
Cross-country mountain bikers
Commonwealth Games competitors for England
Cyclists at the 2014 Commonwealth Games
Cyclists at the 2016 Summer Olympics
Olympic cyclists of Great Britain